Thomas Ellis of Kennington, Kent was an English politician.

Family
Ellis was the son of William Ellis and Isabel his wife.  He married Katherine Barry, daughter and heiress of John Barry of Sevington, Kent. They are thought to have had two sons and three daughters.

Career
Ellis was elected a Member of Parliament for Kent in December 1421 and appointed High Sheriff of Kent for 1427–28.

References

Year of birth missing
Year of death missing
People from Ashford, Kent
English MPs December 1421
High Sheriffs of Kent